Mali Pesak (in Serbian Cyrillic: Мали Песак, in Hungarian: Kishomok) is a village in Serbia. It is situated in the Kanjiža municipality, in the North Banat District, Vojvodina province. The village has a Hungarian ethnic majority (100.0%) and its population numbering 115 people (2002 census).

See also
List of places in Serbia
List of cities, towns and villages in Vojvodina

Places in Bačka